This is a list of diplomatic missions of Italy, excluding honorary consulates. Italy has a large global network of diplomatic missions. It is the only country in the world to have an embassy on its own territory—the Italian embassy to the Holy See is in Rome.

Current missions

Africa

Americas

Asia

Europe

Oceania

Multilateral organisations

Closed missions

Africa

Americas

Asia

Europe

See also
 Foreign relations of Italy
 List of diplomatic missions in Italy

Notes

References

Ministry of Foreign Affairs of Italy

 
Italy
Diplomatic missions